The Anglican Diocese of Ilesa is one of 19 within the Anglican Province of Ibadan, itself one of 14 provinces within the Church of Nigeria. The current bishop is Olubayo Sowale.

Ephraim Ademowo was bishop of the diocese from 1989 to 2000.

Notes

Church of Nigeria dioceses
Dioceses of the Province of Ibadan